Montanineta is a monotypic genus of North American leptonetid spiders containing the single species, Montanineta sandra. It was first described by J. Ledford in 2011, and has only been found in the United States.

See also
 List of Leptonetidae species

References

Leptonetidae
Monotypic Araneomorphae genera
Spiders of the United States